Eloisa Is Under an Almond Tree (Spanish:Eloísa está debajo de un almendro) is a 1943 Spanish comedy film directed by Rafael Gil and starring Amparo Rivelles and Rafael Durán and Guadalupe Muñoz Sampedro.

The film's sets were designed by Enrique Alarcón.

Plot 
The film tells the story of Fernando (Rafael Durán) who returns home after the death of his father. In a letter he asks her to solve the crime of a woman that occurred years ago. This leads him to come into contact with the strange inhabitants of a peculiar mansion, among whom he discovers the beautiful Mariana (Amparo Rivelles), with whom he falls madly in love.

Cast
 Amparo Rivelles as Mariana  
 Rafael Durán as Fernando 
 Guadalupe Muñoz Sampedro as Clotilde 
 Juan Espantaleón as Edgardo 
 Alberto Romea as Ezequiel 
 Juan Domenech as Leoncio  
 Joaquín Roa as Fermín  
 José Prada as Dimas / Luis Perea  
 Ana de Siria as Micaela 
 Angelita Navalón as Práxedes  
 Nicolás D. Perchicot as Presidente del Liceo  
 Enrique Herreros as Acomodador del cine  
 Mary Delgado as Julia

References

Bibliography
 de España, Rafael. Directory of Spanish and Portuguese film-makers and films. Greenwood Press, 1994.

External links 

1943 films
1943 comedy films
Spanish comedy films
1940s Spanish-language films
Films directed by Rafael Gil
Cifesa films
Films scored by Juan Quintero Muñoz
Spanish black-and-white films
1940s Spanish films